Semur is an Indonesian meat stew (mainly beef) braised in thick brown gravy. It is commonly found in Indonesian cuisine. The main ingredients in the gravy are sweet soy sauce, shallots, onions, garlic, ginger, candlenut, nutmeg, and cloves (and sometimes with black pepper, coriander, cumin, and cinnamon).

Sweet soy sauce is the most important ingredient in the semur-making process because it serves to strengthen the flavor, but it should still be blended harmoniously with the other ingredients. In addition to the spices and seasonings, semur also consists of a wide range of main ingredients with variation in the presentation, such as meat (mainly beef), beef tongue, potato, tofu, tomato, tempeh, eggs, chicken, fish and often sprinkled with fried shallots or other variations according to the tastes of the communities in each regions.

Etymology
Semur is derived from the Dutch verb "smoren", which means "to braise food".

History and origins

History shows that the dish of marinated boiled meat in Indonesia has been known since the 9th century CE in ancient Java. This can be seen from some of the inscriptions, and reliefs of the temples in Java that tells "Ganan, hadanan prana wdus" or "buffaloes and goats served with vegetables". However, whether the buffalo and goat meat mentioned in these records was the same dishes like stews today is still uncertain.

For centuries, Indonesia has attracted world traders for its natural resources. Exotic flavors of Indonesian spices such as nutmeg, cloves and cinnamon have attracted traders. Foreign traders and immigrants brought their culture, which gradually blended into everyday Indonesian culture. This assimilation has developed a blend of traditions of the archipelago, including culinary. The European Dutch colonial believed to have brought the stew technique, and combine it with local spices and local sweet soy sauce, dark soy sauce with caramelized palm sugar and various spiced added, that has become one of the most popular flavouring. The particular flavor of Indonesian spices combined with a variety of foreign food processing techniques has resulted in the creation of unique dishes such as semur, which existed from 1600.

Centuries of interactions between the Netherlands and Indonesia have contributed to the development of the stew's flavor. Javanese stew that in the earlier served as the main menu in the banquet of the Dutch is derived from the word smoor (Dutch: "stew"). Smoor in Dutch means food that has simmered with tomatoes and onions in a long cook process. One of the oldest and most cookbook recipes complete document in the Dutch East Indies, Groot Nieuw Oost-Indisch Volledig Kookboek published in 1902, contains six recipes stew (Smoor Ajam I, Ajam Smoor II, Smoor Ajam III, Smoor Bandjar van Kip, Smoor Bantam van Kip, Solosche Smoor van Kip). This book asserts that the later smoor stew was the kitchen cooking method developed in Dutch East Indies (Indonesia) by the Eurasian.

Over time, semur was incorporated into Indonesian tradition and served in a variety of traditional events. Javanese with their preference on sweet dishes has favoured semur and consider it as part of Javanese cuisine. Betawi people in Jakarta have adopted semur as part of their tradition that is always served during Lebaran, weddings, and any important celebrations. Betawi people like to cook dogfruit with spices and soy sauce to make semur jengkol (dogfruit stew). Not only Betawi culture, semur are also often appeared on the celebration events in various parts of the archipelago such as Kalimantan and Sumatra, with the flavor and appearance that suit local tastes.

At first, semur was associated to the beef that is processed in thick brown gravy. However it was later developed into various ingredients and recipes; ox tongue, mutton, chicken, eggs, also for vegetable products, such as tofu, tempeh, eggplant, and others. Semur has become a daily dishes served in Indonesian households and can be found in various parts of Indonesia.

Semur might be served individually with rice, lontong, or as part of the whole complete meal of rijsttafel, buffet or as one of side dishes in tumpeng, nasi uduk or nasi rames.

Varieties of semur
Semur daging or semur jawa: beef and potato semur, the most common type of semur commonly found in Java
Semur betawi: semur of Betawi people in Jakarta, usually consist of beef, potato, and eggs with slightly different spices
Semur ayam: chicken semur commonly found in Java
Semur jengkol: jengkol stinky-bean semur popular in Jakarta and West Java
Semur manado: semur from Manado North Sulawesi
Semur banjar: semur from Banjarmasin South Kalimantan
Semur lidah: beef tongue semur
Semur aceh: Aceh beef semur
Semur goreng samarinda: fried semur from Samarinda
Semur ikan purwokerto: fish semur from Purwokerto
Semur ternate: semur from Ternate vinegar added
Semur kelapa: coconut semur from Maluku
Semur terong tahu: eggplant and tofu semur from West Java

See also

 List of beef dishes
 List of stews

References 

Indonesian stews
Beef dishes
Indonesian beef dishes